This article is about the rolling stock of the Romanian Railways - Căile Ferate Române.

Electric Locomotives

Diesel Locomotives

Electric Multiple Unit

Diesel Multiple Unit 

Rolling stock of Romania
Căile Ferate Române